Ana Biškić (born 9 July 1999) is a Croatian tennis player.

Biškić has a career high WTA singles ranking of 747, achieved on 29 January 2018. She also has a career high WTA doubles ranking of 1184, achieved on 12 June 2017.

Biškić made her Fed Cup debut for Croatia in 2018.

External links
 
 
 

1999 births
Living people
Croatian female tennis players
21st-century Croatian women